Bournemouth is a coastal resort town on the south coast in the Bournemouth, Christchurch and Poole borough of Dorset, England. The town had a population of 183,491 at the 2011 census making it the largest town in the county; the town is part of the South East Dorset conurbation, which has a population of 465,000. 

The town was formerly governed under Hampshire: it is equidistant, between Dorchester to the west and Southampton to the east. Founded in 1810 by Lewis Tregonwell, in an area of deserted heathland occasionally visited by fishermen and smugglers, as a health resort. It became a town in 1870, with growth from the arrival of the railway. Following the local government reorganisation in 1974 the town was governed by Dorset County Council. The borough gained unitary authority in 1997, it remains under Dorset's ceremonial county functions and emergency services. In April 2019, the borough was replaced by the current borough, also with unitary authority, governing the town, Poole, Christchurch and surrounding areas.

Victorian architecture is notable in town centre. The  spire of St Peter's Church, one of three Grade I listed churches in the borough, is a local landmark. The town's location has made it a popular destination for tourists, attracting over five million visitors annually with its beaches and popular nightlife. It is also a regional centre of business, home of the Bournemouth International Centre (BIC) and a financial sector that is worth more than £1 billion in gross value added.

Toponymy

"La Bournemowthe", however, was purely a geographic reference to the uninhabited area around the mouth of the small river which, in turn, drained the heathland between the towns of Poole and Christchurch. The word bourne, meaning a small stream, is a derivative of burna, old English for a brook. From the latter half of the 16th century "Bourne Mouth" seems to be preferred, being recorded as such in surveys and reports of the period, but this appears to have been shortened to "Bourne" after the area had started to develop. A travel guide published in 1831 calls the place "Bourne Cliffe" or "Tregonwell's Bourne" after its founder. The Spas of England, published ten years later, calls it simply "Bourne" as does an 1838 edition of the Hampshire Advertiser. In the late 19th century "Bournemouth" became predominant, although its two-word form appears to have remained in use up until at least the early 20th century, turning up on a 1909 ordnance map. The Coat of arms of Bournemouth was first granted on 24 March 1891.

History

In the 12th century the region around the mouth of the River Bourne was part of the Hundred of Holdenhurst. The hundred later became the Liberty of Westover when it was extended to include the settlements of North Ashley, Muscliff, Muccleshell, Throop, Iford, Pokesdown, Tuckton and Wick, and incorporated into the Manor of Christchurch. Although the Dorset and Hampshire region surrounding it had been the site of human settlement for thousands of years, Westover was largely a remote and barren heathland before 1800. In 1574 the Earl of Southampton noted that the area was "Devoid of all habitation", and as late as 1795 the Duke of Rutland recorded that "... on this barren and uncultivated heath there was not a human to direct us".

In the late 19th and early 20th centuries the Borough of Bournemouth would grow to encompass a number of ancient settlements along the River Stour, including Longham where a skull thought to be 5,500 years old was found in 1932. Bronze Age burials near Moordown, and the discovery of Iron Age pottery on the East Cliff in 1969, suggest there may have been settlements there during that period. Hengistbury Head, added to the borough in 1932, was the site of a much older Palaeolithic encampment. During the latter half of the 16th century James Blount, 6th Baron Mountjoy, began mining for alum in the area, and at one time part of the heath was used for hunting, although by the late 18th century little evidence of either event remained. No-one lived at the mouth of the Bourne river and the only regular visitors to the area before the 19th century were a few fishermen, turf cutters and gangs of smugglers.

Prior to the Christchurch Inclosures Act 1802, more than 70% of the Westover area was common land. The act, together with the Inclosure Commissioners' Award of 1805, transferred  into the hands of five private owners, including James Harris, 1st Earl of Malmesbury, and Sir George Ivison Tapps. In 1809 the Tapps Arms public house appeared on the heath. A few years later, in 1812, the first official residents, retired army officer Lewis Tregonwell and his wife, moved into their new home built on land purchased from Tapps. The area was well known to Tregonwell who, during the Napoleonic Wars, spent much of his time searching the heath and coastline for French invaders and smugglers.

Anticipating that people would come to the area to indulge in the newly fashionable pastime of sea-bathing, an activity with perceived health benefits, Tregonwell built a series of villas on his land between 1816 and 1822, which he hoped to let out. The common belief that pine-scented air was good for lung conditions, and in particular tuberculosis, prompted Tregonwell and Tapps to plant hundreds of pine trees. These early attempts to promote the town as a health resort meant that by the time Tregonwell died in 1832, Bournemouth had grown into a small community with a scattering of houses, villas and cottages. The town would ultimately grow up around the scattered pines and tree-lined walk to the beach, later to become known as the Invalids' Walk.

After the death of Tapps in 1835, his son Sir George William Tapps-Gervis inherited his father's estate. He hired the young local architect Benjamin Ferrey to develop Bournemouth Gardens along the coastal area on the east side of the stream. Bournemouth's first hotel, later to become part of the Royal Bath Hotel, opened in 1838 and is one of the few buildings designed by Ferrey still standing and operating. Bournemouth grew at a faster rate as Tapps-Gervis began developing the area similarly to the south coast resorts of Weymouth and Brighton. Despite enormous investment, the town's share of the market remained modest. In 1841 Tapps-Gervis invited the physician and writer Augustus Granville to stay. Granville was the author of The Spas of England, which described health resorts around the country, and as a result of his visit, he included a chapter on Bournemouth in the second edition of his book. The publication of the book, and the increase in visitors seeking the medicinal use of seawater and the pine-scented air, helped the town to grow and establish itself as an early tourist destination.

In the 1840s Benjamin Ferrey was replaced by Decimus Burton, whose plans for Bournemouth included the construction of Bournemouth Gardens alongside the Bourne stream, an idea first mooted by Granville. The fields south of the road crossing (later Bournemouth Square) were drained and laid out with shrubberies and walks. Many of these paths, including the Invalids' Walk, remain in the town today. A second suggestion of Granville's, a sanatorium, was completed in 1855 and greatly raised Bournemouth's profile as a place for recuperation.

At a time when the most convenient way to arrive in the town was by sea, a pier was considered to be a necessity. Holdenhurst Parish Council was reluctant to find the money, and an attempt to raise funds privately in 1847 had only succeeded in financing a small  jetty. The Bournemouth Improvement Act of 1856 granted greater financial autonomy to the town and a pier was approved that year. A number of wooden structures were built before an  cast iron design by Eugenius Birch was completed in 1880. Under the Act, a board of 13 Commissioners was established to build and organise the expanding infrastructure of the town, such as paving, sewers, drainage, street lighting and street cleaning.

The arrival of the railways in 1870 precipitated a massive growth in seaside and summer visitors to the town, especially from the Midlands and London. In 1880 the town had a population of 17,000, but by 1900, when railway connections to Bournemouth were at their most developed, the town's population had risen to 60,000 and it had become a favourite location for visiting artists and writers. The town was improved greatly during this period through the efforts of Sir Merton Russell-Cotes, the town's mayor and a local philanthropist, who helped to establish the town's first library and museum. The Russell-Cotes Art Gallery & Museum was housed in his mansion, and after his death, it was given to the town. Bournemouth became a municipal borough in 1890 and a county borough in 1900. 

As Bournemouth's growth increased in the early 20th century, the town centre spawned theatres, cafés, two art deco cinemas, and more hotels. Bournemouth Corporation Tramways was established in 1902, becoming the towns first public transport system. In 1908, a deadly tram crash in the town gardens killed 7 people. Other new buildings constructed included the war memorial in 1921 and the Bournemouth Pavilion, the town's concert hall and grand theatre, finished in 1925.

The Bournemouth Blitz saw heavy damage to the town during the Second World War despite initially escaping heavy bombing. A raid by German fighter bombers on 23 May 1943 killed 131 people and damaged 3,359 buildings, with two large hotels being completely destroyed. It is believed that the large number of RAF airmen billeted in the town may have been the reason for the attack. The seafront incurred damage when it was fortified against invasion. The cast iron lampposts and benches along the front were removed and melted down for munitions, as was much of the superstructure from both Bournemouth and Boscombe piers before they were breached to prevent their use by enemy ships. The large amounts of barbed wire and anti-tank obstacles along the beach, and the mines at the foot of the chines, took two years to remove when peace was finally achieved.

The Royal National Lifeboat Institution stationed an inshore lifeboat at Bournemouth between 1965 and 1972. Coverage for the area has otherwise been provided from Poole Lifeboat Station. The Bournemouth International Centre (BIC), a large conference and exhibition centre, was constructed near the seafront in 1984, and in the following year Bournemouth became the first town in the United Kingdom to introduce and use CCTV cameras for public street-based surveillance.

In 1993, the IRA orchestrated a terrorist attack in the town centre. The only injuries sustained were minor ones but over £1 million in damage was caused.

From 2000-2001 the Tesco bomb campaign hit the town with a plot to extort money from Supermarket giant Tesco. Visitors to the town plummeted during the campaign, especially after a bomb exploded at an elderly woman’s home after she opened a letter sent by the bomber. During the eight months, over seven bombs were found by Dorset Police, ranging from small letter bombs, to pipe bombs and parcel bombs. The culprit was found to be Robert Edward Dyer, he was sentenced to 12 years in prison.

The Waterfront complex, which was intended to hold an IMAX cinema, was constructed on the seafront in 1998. The  concrete and smoked glass building featured a wavy roof design, but was despised by residents and visitors alike because it blocked views of the bay and the Isle of Purbeck. In 2005 it was voted the most hated building in England in a 10,000-person poll conducted by the Channel 4 programme Demolition, and was pulled down in spring 2013. The site is now used as an outdoor event arena. The council has recently completed a larger redevelopment of the site and adjoining council land.

In 2010, Bournemouth celebrated its bicentenary. In 2012 Bournemouth was unsuccessful in its bid for city status, losing out to Chelmsford, Essex in competition with 26 other towns to commemorate Queen Elizabeth II's Diamond Jubilee. Bournemouth sought city status once again for the Platinum Jubilee Civic Honours but was unsuccessful.

Governance

Historically Bournemouth was part of Hampshire, with neighbouring Poole, just to the west of the border, in Dorset. At the time of the 1974 local government re-organisation, it was considered desirable that the whole of the Poole/Bournemouth urban area should be part of the same county. Bournemouth, therefore, became part of the non-metropolitan county of Dorset on 1 April 1974. On 1 April 1997, Bournemouth became a unitary authority, independent from Dorset County Council. For local elections the district was divided into 18 wards, with the Bournemouth Borough Council elected every four years. In the 2011 local elections the Conservatives held overall control, winning 45 of the available 51 seats. The Council elects a mayor and deputy mayor annually. The Mayor of Bournemouth for 2019-20 was Councillor Susan Phillips.

As from April 2019, the nine councils of Dorset were merged into two and Bournemouth became part of a unitary authority with Christchurch and Poole (known as BCP). For the purposes of the Lieutenancy it remains part of the ceremonial county of Dorset. BCP held its first elections in 2019, which resulted in the Conservatives as the largest party, but with No Overall Control; A Unity Alliance Administration of other groups subsequently formed. The next elections are due to occur in 2024.

Bournemouth is represented by two parliamentary constituencies in the House of Commons; Bournemouth East and Bournemouth West. In the 2017 general election, the former was held for the Conservatives by Tobias Ellwood with 51.9% of the vote, while the latter was also held for the Conservatives by Conor Burns with 53.5%. However, the seats saw some of the largest increases in Labour vote share in the country, with increases of over 18% in each. In 2022, both of the towns Conservative MPs, Conor Burns and Tobias Ellwood had the whip withdrawn forcing them to sit as Independents.

Geography

The town borders the neighbouring towns of Poole and Christchurch to the west and east respectively. Poole Bay lies to the south. The River Stour forms a natural boundary to the north and east, terminating at Christchurch Harbour; while the River Bourne rises in Poole and flows through the middle of Bournemouth town centre, into the English Channel. The towns of Poole, Bournemouth and Christchurch form the South East Dorset conurbation with a combined population of over 400,000. Bournemouth is both a retail and commercial centre. Areas within Bournemouth include: Boscombe, Kinson, Southbourne, Springbourne, Throop, Westbourne, Winton and Pokesdown.

The area's geology has little variety, comprising almost entirely of Eocene clays which, prior to urbanisation, supported a heathland environment. Patches of the original heath still remain, notably Turbary Common, a  site, much of which is designated a Site of Special Scientific Interest. This heathland habitat is home to all six species of native reptile, the Dartford warbler and some important flora such as sundew and bog asphodel. Small populations of Exmoor pony and Shetland cattle help to maintain the area.
Bournemouth is directly north of Old Harry Rocks, the easternmost end of the Jurassic Coast,  of coastline designated a World Heritage Site in 2001. Bournemouth's own coastline stretches from Sandbanks to Christchurch Harbour and comprises mainly sandy beaches backed by gravel and sandy clay cliffs. These cliffs are cut by a number of chines which provide natural access to the shore. At the easternmost point lies Hengistbury Head, a narrow peninsula that forms the southern shore of Christchurch Harbour. It is a local nature reserve and the site of a Bronze Age settlement.

Climate
Like all of the UK, Bournemouth has a temperate oceanic climate with moderate variation in annual and daily temperatures, mild summers, and cool winters. It records both higher and lower temperatures than would be expected for its coastal location. The February record high was broken in 2019, with a new record temperature of 17.8C.

Green belt 

Bournemouth lies at the centre of a green belt region that extends into the wider surrounding counties. It is in place to reduce urban sprawl, prevent the towns in the South East Dorset conurbation from further convergence, protect the identity of outlying communities, and preserve nearby countryside. This is achieved by restricting inappropriate development within the designated areas, and imposing stricter conditions on permitted building.

Bournemouth has small areas of green belt within its district to the north and east, mostly along the fringes of the shared border with the Christchurch and East Dorset districts. These cover landscape features and greenfield facilities including the River Stour, Stour Valley Way, Millhams Mead and Stour Valley nature reserves and arboretum, Hengistbury Head, and the small communities of Throop and Holdenhurst. Turbary Park is a heathland which is a protected Site of Special Scientific Interest.

Demography

The 2011 census records the population of Bournemouth as 183,491, comprising 91,386 males and 92,105 females, which equates to 49.8% and 50.2% of the population respectively. The mean average age of all persons is 40 years. With 4,000 residents per square kilometre, Bournemouth has the highest population density of any authority in the South-West region, and is the eighth most populated.

Much of the population, 83.8%, describe their ethnicity as 'White British' while other white groups account for a further 8.1%.Asian groups; Indian, Pakistani, Bangladeshi, Chinese and other Asian, make up 3.9%. Black British, Black African, Black Caribbean and other Black groups form 1.0% of the population, Those who are Mixed race make up 2.3% of the population, and 0.9% are from other ethnic groups.

Christians made up 57.1% of the population but 30% of residents said they had no religion and 7.8% declined to say whether they were religious or not.  Muslims were 1.8%, Buddhists, Hindus and Jews each had a 0.7% share, Sikhs were 0.1%. and other religions made up 0.7%.

Of all Bournemouth residents aged 16 or over, 19.1% had no qualifications at all, although 35% said they had between one and four O-levels, CSEs, GCSEs or equivalent, and 36.5% have more than five O-level equivalents (grade C and above), an A-level or two to three AS-levels. Those with an NVQ level 1 comprise 8.0% of the population while 15.2% have a level 2 NVQ, a City and Guilds craft certificate, BTEC or general diploma. Just over 20% of residents had two or more A-levels, four or more AS-Levels or an advanced diploma while 15.8% possessed a degree, such as a BA or BSc or a higher degree such as an MA or PhD. An NVQ level 4 or 5, HNC, HND, higher BTEC or higher diploma, is held by 4.2% and a professional qualification is held by 13.9% of residents. An apprenticeship has been completed by 6.3% of the population while 16.9% have some other work-related or vocational qualification and 8.3% hold a foreign qualification.

Historically Bournemouth has suffered from negative rates of natural increase and has relied on immigration to maintain population growth. In 2007 however, births exceeded deaths for the first time, and this trend has continued through to 2011. This, coupled with a substantial increase in people moving into the area, has led to a sharp rise in the resident population since 2001. Of the total population, 3.3% are 85 or over, compared to 2.2% nationally; however the largest group of people moving into the area are students in the 16-24-year age group, and 9% of the current population are between 20 and 24. In England this age group accounts for only 7%. According to the Centre for Cities in 2016, Bournemouth's population had the third highest average age among 63 large towns and cities in the UK, at 42.8 years.

Economy

Similarly to the rest of Dorset, Bournemouth's economy is primarily in the service sector, which employed 95% of the workforce in 2010. This was 10% higher than the average employment in the service sector for Great Britain and 11% higher than the South West. Of particular importance are the financial and public service sectors which through 2011 continued to show sustained growth. Compared to the rest of the country, Bournemouth performed well in these two areas but under performed in transport and communications.

The smallest geographical region for which gross value added information is available is the NUTS3 area, Bournemouth and Poole. The latest figures, are for the year 2009 which showed that the Bournemouth and Poole area enjoyed the strongest annualised growth in the South-West region. In 2009 the South West Regional Accounts showed that the Financial Services sector in Bournemouth was worth £1,031.8 million in Gross Value Added. Important employers in this sector include JPMorgan, Nationwide Building Society, and the Liverpool Victoria, Tata Consultancy Services (formerly Unisys), and RIAS insurance companies. The manufacturing sector is predominantly based in neighbouring Poole, but still employed 2% of the workforce in 2010 and 2.6% in 2011. Notable employers in this sector include Escor Toys and Parvalux.

Tourism is also important to the local economy. In 2011, domestic and overseas visitors made more than 5.6 million trips to the town and spent over £460 million between them. The equivalent of 8,531 full-time jobs exist as a result which accounts for 15% of all employment in the town. Bournemouth seafront is one of the UK's biggest attractions with 4.5 million visitors in 2011. RNLI lifeguards provide seasonal coverage of Bournemouth's beaches.

With a third of all town centre businesses in the leisure industry, Bournemouth has a booming nightlife economy and is a popular destination for stag and hen parties. These party-goers contribute £125 million a year to the economy and support 4,000 jobs. In 2010 the town was awarded a Purple Flag for providing a wide variety of night-time activities while maintaining the safety of both residents and visitors. An independent report published in 2012 indicates there has been a rise in antisocial behaviour which it attributes to the increase in nightlife.

Those of working age make up approximately 65% of Bournemouth's population and of these, 74.6% are economically active although not necessarily employed within the Bournemouth area. Industry in Bournemouth employed more than 76,400 people in 2011 but not all of these were Bournemouth residents. Of those employed in Bournemouth based industries, 29.32% were employed in the public administration, education and health sector. This compares favourably with Dorset, the South-West region, and the country as a whole, as do the other large sectors; distribution, hotels & restaurants (29.06%), and banking, finance and insurance (24.48%).
37.2% of Bournemouth's resident population are employed full-time while 13.3% are employed part-time. An additional 7.1% full-time workers are self-employed, 3.1% are self-employed part-time. Full-time students with jobs account for 5.3% and 3.8% are unemployed.

The shopping streets are mostly pedestrianised with modern shopping malls, Victorian arcades and a large selection of bars, clubs, and cafés. North of the centre there is an out-of-town shopping complex called Castlepoint. The  site has 40 units and was the largest shopping centre in the UK when it opened it 2003. Other major shopping areas are situated in the districts of Westbourne and Boscombe.

Culture

Bournemouth is a tourist and regional centre for leisure, entertainment, culture and recreation. Local author and former mayor, Keith Rawlings, suggests that Bournemouth has a thriving youth culture due to its large university population and many language school students. In recent years, Bournemouth has become a popular nightlife destination with UK visitors and many clubs, bars and restaurants are located within the town centre. In a 2007 survey by First Direct, Bournemouth was found to be the happiest place in the UK, with 82% of people questioned saying they were happy with their lives.

Major venues for concerts include BIC, Pavilion Theatre and O2 Academy. Built in 1984, the BIC is also a popular place for party political conferences and has been used by all three major political parties. Its four auditoria make it the largest venue on the south coast. The O2 and Pavilion are older and are both Grade II listed buildings. The O2, which opened in 1895 as the Grand Pavilion Theatre, was initially used as a circus and later for music hall theatre. The Pavilion opened in 1929 as concert hall and tea room while also providing a venue for the municipal orchestra. It continues to provide traditional entertainment today, presenting West End stage shows, ballet and operas. Bournemouth has more than 200 listed buildings, mainly from the Victorian and Edwardian eras, including three grade I churches; St Peter's, St Clement's and St Stephen's.

The Russell-Cotes Museum is a Grade II* listed, villa completed in 1901. It houses artefacts and paintings collected by the Victorian philanthropist Merton Russell-Cotes and his wife during their extensive travels around the world. The four art galleries display paintings by William Powell Frith, Edwin Landseer, Edwin Long, William Orchardson, Arthur Hughes, Albert Moore and Dante Gabriel Rossetti. It was Russell-Cotes who successfully campaigned to have a promenade built; it runs continuously along the Bournemouth and Poole shoreline.

The Lower, Central and Upper Gardens are Grade II* public parks, leading for several miles down the valley of the River Bourne through the centre of the town to the sea. Bournemouth has a further  of parkland. Initially serving to compensate for the loss of common rights after common land was enclosed in 1802, it was held in trust until 1889 when ownership passed to Bournemouth Corporation and the land became five public parks: King's Park, Queen's Park, Meyrick Park, Seafield Gardens and Redhill Common.

The detailed Land Use Survey by the Office for National Statistics in 2005 noted that the local authority area of Bournemouth had the third-highest proportion of land taken up by domestic gardens, 34.6%, of the 326 districts in England; narrowly less than the London Boroughs of Harrow and Sutton at the time with 34.7% and 35.1%.

One of Bournemouth's most noted cultural institutions is Bournemouth Symphony Orchestra which was formed in 1893 under Dan Godfrey. It became the first municipal orchestra in the country when in 1896, Bournemouth Borough Council took control and Godfrey was appointed musical director and head of the town's entertainments. Originally playing three concerts a day during the summer season, in the great glass palm house known as the Winter Gardens; the orchestra is now based in Poole and performs around 130 concerts a year across Southern England.

Bournemouth is currently host to a number of festivals. Bournemouth Food and Drink Festival is a ten-day event which combines a market with live cookery demonstrations. The Arts by the Sea Festival is a mix of dance, film, theatre, literature, and music which was launched in 2012 by the local university, the Arts University Bournemouth, and is set to become an annual event. The Bourne Free carnival is held in the town each year during the summer. Initially a gay pride festival, it has become a celebration of diversity and inclusion. Since 2008, Bournemouth has held its own air festival over four days in August. This has featured displays from the Red Arrows as well as appearances from the Yakovlevs, Blades, Team Guinot Wing-Walkers, Battle of Britain Memorial Flight including Lancaster, Hurricane, Spitfire and also the last flying Vulcan. The festival has also seen appearances from modern aircraft such as the Eurofighter Typhoon. The air festival attracts up to a million people over the four-day event. Bournemouth 7s Festival is a sports and music festival taking place in May each year. Hosting rugby, netball, hockey, dodgeball and volleyball tournaments, the event is a celebration of team sports in a festival atmosphere and was launched in 2008.

The town was especially rich in literary associations during the late 19th century and earlier years of the 20th century. P. C. Wren author of Beau Geste, Frederick E. Smith, writer of the 633 Squadron books, and Beatrice Webb, later Potter, all lived in the town. Paul Verlaine taught at Bournemouth a preparatory school and the writer J. R. R. Tolkien, spent 30 years taking holidays in Bournemouth, staying in the same room at the Hotel Miramar. He eventually retired to the area in the 1960s with his wife Edith, where they lived close to Branksome Chine. Tolkien died in September 1973 at his home in Bournemouth but was buried in Oxfordshire. The house was demolished in 2008.

Percy Florence Shelley lived at Boscombe Manor; a house he had built for his mother, Mary Shelley, the writer and author of the Gothic horror novel, Frankenstein. Mary died before the house was completed but she was buried in Bournemouth, in accordance with her wishes. The family plot in St Peter's churchyard also contains her parents William Godwin and Mary Wollstonecraft, and the heart of her husband, Percy Bysshe Shelley.

Robert Louis Stevenson wrote The Strange Case of Dr. Jekyll and Mr. Hyde and most of his novel Kidnapped from his house "Skerryvore" on the west cliff, Westbourne. A novel of Stevenson's life while residing in Westbourne was written by Adelaide A. Boodle, who had met him there. Henry James, already acquainted with Stevenson through correspondence, and residing in Bournemouth in 1885 in large part because his invalid sister Alice lived there, visited Stevenson most evenings.

Vladimir Chertkov established a Tolstoyan publishing house with other Russian exiles at Tuckton, and under the 'Free Age Press' imprint, published the first edition of several works by Leo Tolstoy. Author Bill Bryson worked for a time with the Bournemouth Echo newspaper and wrote about the town in his 1995 work Notes from a Small Island.

Landmarks
Bournemouth has many historic landmarks, mainly dating from the Victorian and Edwardian era.
Bournemouth has three Grade I listed churches, St Peter's and St Stephen's in the town centre and St Clement's in Boscombe. St Peter's was the town's first church, completed in 1879 and designed by George Edmund Street. In his book, England's Thousand Best Churches, Simon Jenkins describes the chancel as "one of the richest Gothic Revival interiors in England", while the  spire dominates the surrounding skyline. When the architect, John Loughborough Pearson, designed St Stephen's his aim was to "bring people to their knees". It has a high stone groined roof, twin aisles and a triforium gallery, although the tower lacks a spire. Other listed churches include the Victorian St Mark's Church in the historic Talbot Village and the 12th-century St. Andrew's Church in Kinson.

The borough has two piers: Bournemouth Pier, close to the town centre, and the shorter but architecturally more important Boscombe Pier. Added in 1958, the boomerang-shaped entrance kiosk and overhanging concrete roof is now a Grade II listed building. In 1961 a theatre was added but this was demolished in 2008 when the rest of the pier was renovated. In 2009, fashion designer Wayne Hemingway described Boscombe Pier as "Britain's coolest pier". It was also voted Pier of the Year 2010 by the National Piers Society.

In 1856, Bournemouth Pier was a simple, wooden jetty. This was replaced by a longer, wooden pier five years later, and a cast-iron structure in 1880. After World War II, the structure was strengthened to allow for the addition of a Pier Theatre, finally constructed in 1960. This survived until the 2000s when it was turned into a climbing adventure centre. Between 1979 and 1981, a £1.7 million redevelopment programme, saw a great deal of reconstruction work, and the addition of a large two-storey, octagonal-shaped entrance building.

Built as the Mont Dore Hotel in 1881, Bournemouth Town Hall was designated a Grade II listed building in 2001. Designed by Alfred Bedborough in the French, Italian and neo-classical styles, the foundation stone was laid by King Oscar II of Sweden and Norway and the hotel opened in 1885. The buff brick exterior features Bath stone dressings and terracotta friezes. The main entrance is sited within a projected façade that reaches to the eaves and is topped with a pediment, while above sits a belvedere with turrets and a pavilion roof. During the First World War the hotel was used as a hospital for British and Indian soldiers and after as a convalescent home. It never opened as a hotel again and was purchased by Bournemouth Borough Council in 1919. Other Victorian hotels in Bournemouth include the Royal Bath Hotel in the Town Centre and the Norfolk Royale Hotel in Richmond Hill.

Built in the Art Deco style in 1929, situated close to the seafront, the Pavilion Theatre was at the time considered to be the greatest ever municipal enterprise for the benefit of entertainment. Built from brick and stone, the frontage features square Corinthian columns. Still a popular venue, it is today a Grade II listed building.

The Bournemouth Eye was a helium-filled balloon attached to a steel cable in the town's lower gardens.
  After the balloon suffered damage in 2016, the Bournemouth Borough Council, Lower Central Gardens Trust and S&D Leisure announced in 2017 that the contract for operating the Bournemouth Eye would not be renewed due to "increased operating costs."

Sport

The town has a professional football club, AFC Bournemouth, known as the Cherries, which play in the Premier League.

Bournemouth Rugby Club, which competes in the National League Division Two South, has its home at Bournemouth Sports Club. The sports club is next to Bournemouth Airport, and hosts an annual Bournemouth 7s Festival, the world's largest sport and music festival, combining Rugby sevens, netball, hockey, dodgeball and crossfit tournaments with festival entertainment. Oakmeadians RFC is the oldest RFU Accredited Rugby Club in Bournemouth, established in 1963.They train and play at Meyrick Park competing in the South West Division. Bournemouth Cricket Club also plays at Bournemouth Sports Club and is reported to be one of the biggest cricket clubs in the country. Its first team plays in the Southern Premier League.
Dean Park is a former county cricket ground, once home to Hampshire County Cricket Club and later Dorset County Cricket Club. Today it is a venue for university cricket.

The BIC has become a venue for a round of the Premier League Darts Championship organised by the Professional Darts Corporation.

The Bournemouth Rowing Club, is the town's coastal rowing club. Established in 1865 as Westover and Bournemouth Rowing Club, it is reported to be the oldest sporting association in the county. The club regularly competes in regattas organised by the Hants and Dorset Amateur Rowing Association which take place on the South Coast of England between May and September.

Other watersports popular in Poole Bay include sailing and surfing, and there are a number of local schools for the beginner to learn either sport. Bournemouth has the third largest community of surfers in the UK and in 2009 an artificial surf reef, one of only four in the world, was constructed there. The reef failed to deliver the promised grade 5 wave, suffered a series of delays and ran over budget, finally costing £3.2 million.

Transport

Road
The principal route to the town centre is the A338 spur road, a dual carriageway that connects to the A31 close to the Hampshire border. The A31 joins the M27 at Cadnam and from there the M3 to London and the A34 to the Midlands and the North can be accessed. The main road west is the A35 to Honiton in Devon which runs through the South East Dorset Conurbation and continues east as far as Southampton, albeit as a non-primary route. The A350 in the neighbouring borough of Poole provides the only northern route out of the conurbation. National Express coaches serve Bournemouth Travel Interchange & Bournemouth University. There are frequent departures to London Victoria Coach Station and Heathrow and Gatwick Airports. Local buses are provided mainly by two companies, Wilts & Dorset, the former National Bus Company subsidiary and now owned by the Go-Ahead Group, and until they ceased operating on 4 August 2022 Yellow Buses, the former Bournemouth Council-owned company and successors to Bournemouth Corporation Transport, which began operating trams in 1902. Other operators serving the town include Damory Coaches, also owned by Go-Ahead Group and the Shaftesbury & District bus company.

Rail

There are two stations in the town, Bournemouth railway station and Pokesdown railway station to the east. Parts of western Bournemouth can also be reached from Branksome station. All three stations lie on the South West Main Line from Weymouth to London Waterloo. South Western Railway operates a comprehensive service along this line, which also serves Southampton, Winchester and Basingstoke to the east, and Poole, Wareham, and Dorchester South to the west. Before its closure in 1966, Bournemouth was also served by the Somerset and Dorset Joint Railway which provided direct access to Somerset and the Midlands.

Air
Originally an RAF airfield, Bournemouth Airport was transferred to the Civil Aviation Authority in 1944 and was the UK's only intercontinental airport before the opening of Heathrow Airport in 1946. Acquired by the Manchester Airports Group in 2001, the airport underwent a £45 million phased expansion programme between 2007 and 2011. There are direct flights to 23 international destinations in nine countries: Cyprus, Finland, Greece (3 destinations), Italy (4), Malta, Portugal, Spain (10), Switzerland and Turkey.

Education

The Bournemouth local education authority was first set up in 1903 and remained in existence until local government was reorganised in 1974 when Bournemouth lost its County Borough status and became part of the county of Dorset. Under the later reforms of 1997, Bournemouth became a unitary authority and the Bournemouth local education authority was re-established.

The local council operates a two-tier comprehensive system whereby pupils attend one of the 26 primary schools in the borough before completing their education at secondary school. Bournemouth is one of the minority of local authorities in England still to maintain selective education, with two grammar schools (one for boys, one for girls) and ten secondary modern/comprehensive schools. There are also a small number of independent schools in the town, and a further education college. Bournemouth has two universities: Bournemouth University and Arts University Bournemouth, both of which are located across the boundary in neighbouring Poole. They are also home to AECC University College (formally known as Anglo European College of Chiropractic), which is located on Parkwood Road in Bournemouth. In 2012, 60.7% of the borough's school leavers gained 5 GCSEs of grade C or above. This was slightly better than the national average of 59.4% and above the average for the rest of Dorset, with 58.8% of pupils from the local authority of Poole, and 54.1% from the remainder of the county, managing to do likewise.

Religion

The 2011 census revealed that 57.1% of the borough's population are Christian. With all other religions combined only totalling 4.7%, Christianity is by far the largest religious group.
40% of the borough falls within the Church of England Diocese of Salisbury. The remainder, to the east, belongs to the Diocese of Winchester.
The Roman Catholic Diocese of Portsmouth incorporates most of Bournemouth with the exception of two small parishes to the west which are covered by the Diocese of Plymouth.

The borough has several notable examples of Victorian church architecture including the previously mentioned St. Peter's, the churchyard of which contains the grave of the author Mary Shelley; St Stephen's Church, completed in 1898 for services under the influence of the Oxford Movement and St Clement's, one of the first churches to be designed by John Dando Sedding, built in Boscombe in 1871. To serve a rapidly expanding population a third church was built in the town centre in 1891. St Augustin's church was commissioned by Henry Twells who was 'priest-in-charge' there until 1900. The largest church in the town is the Richmond Hill St Andrew's Church, part of the United Reformed Church. Built in 1865 and enlarged in 1891, it has a seating capacity of 1,100 and is unusually ornate for a non-conformist church.

Few purpose-built places of worship exist in the borough for faiths other than Christianity, although with a higher proportion of Jewish residents than the national average, there are three synagogues.
Chabad-Lubavitch of Bournemouth is a branch of the worldwide movement. The Bournemouth Reform Synagogue, formerly known as Bournemouth New Synagogue, is a Reform Jewish synagogue with over 700 members. There is also the architecturally notable Bournemouth Hebrew Congregation synagogue built in 1911 with an Art Nouveau take on the Moorish Revival style. There are also two Christadelphian meeting halls in the town.

The Bournemouth Islamic Centre provides information, support and a place of worship for the Islamic community. There is also a mosque in the town.

Naming conventions
The word 'Bournemouth' is often used loosely to describe the South East Dorset conurbation, which also contains the neighbouring towns of Poole, Christchurch, Wimborne Minster, and Verwood. As a result, "Bournemouth" is used in the following terms:
 Although it has a significant presence in Bournemouth town centre, Bournemouth University's main campus is located in Poole, on the boundary with Bournemouth.
 Bournemouth Airport is located near Hurn in the borough of Christchurch, and was originally named RAF Hurn.
 "Bournemouth Bay" is sometimes used for Poole Bay
 The Bournemouth Symphony Orchestra is now based in Poole.

Notable people 

A number of famous people came from Bournemouth. Tony Hancock lived for most of his early life in hotels in Bournemouth run by his parents.

A number of TV actors came from Bournemouth, including Juliette Kaplan from the BBC comedy Last of the Summer Wine, Ray Lonnen from the series The Sandbaggers (1978–80), Alison Newman, actress who played Hazel Bailey in Footballers' Wives and DI Samantha Keeble in EastEnders. Jack Donnelly (born 1985) actor, played the role of Jason in the BBC series Atlantis and Sophie Rundle (born 1988) actress, portrayed Ada Shelby in the BBC One series Peaky Blinders and Ben Hardy (born 1991) actor, played Peter Beale in the BBC soap opera EastEnders.

Authors Radclyffe Hall (1880–1943) poet and author, who wrote The Well of Loneliness a groundbreaking work in lesbian literature came from Bournemouth and Dilys Powell CBE (1901–1995) journalist, film critic of The Sunday Times for over fifty years went to school there. Patrick Ensor (1946–2007) editor of Guardian Weekly from 1993 to 2007 also came from Bournemouth.

Bournemouth has been home to a number of musicians, including Max Bygraves OBE (1922–2012) comedian, singer, actor and variety performer. The composer Sir Hubert Parry (1848-1918) was born in Bournemouth. One of Britain's most prolific composers of choral music he is probably best known for his setting to William Blake's words of Jerusalem. The rock band King Crimson included many musicians from Bournemouth including brothers Michael Giles (drums) and Peter Giles (bass).

Bournemouth has been the home of sporting world champions: Freddie Mills (1919–1965), who won the World Light Heavyweight title in 1948. Another famous sportsman, the athlete Charles Bennett (1870–1948), lived in the town after he retired. Bennett, was the first British track and field athlete to become Olympic Champion, winning two gold medals and a silver at the Paris Games in 1900. The tennis player and Wimbledon Championships winner Virginia Wade OBE was born in Bournemouth.

Three recipients of the Victoria Cross came from Bournemouth. Frederick Charles Riggs VC MM (1888–1918), Cecil Noble VC (1891–1915), and Lieutenant Colonel Derek Anthony Seagrim VC (1903–1943),

A distinguished resident of Bournemouth was Sir Donald Coleman Bailey, OBE (1901–1985) a civil engineer who invented the Bailey bridge. Bailey was knighted in 1946 for his bridge design when he was living quietly in Southbourne in Bournemouth.

The heart of Percy Bysshe Shelley, together with Mary Shelley and her mother Mary Wollstonecraft and father William Godwin are all buried at St Peter's Church, Bournemouth. Percy and Mary's son, Sir Percy Florence Shelley lived at Boscombe Manor, now the Shelley Manor Medical Centre, and is also buried in the same vault at St Peter's.

Twin towns

Bournemouth is twinned with:
  Netanya, Israel
  Lucerne, Switzerland

Freedom of the Borough
The following people and military units have received the Freedom of the Borough of Bournemouth.

Individuals
 Lord Roberts of Kandahar: 7 October 1902.
 Sir Winston Churchill.
 Sir Geoffrey Hurst.
 Sir Christopher Hoy.
 Bob Geldof.
 Eddie Howe: 5 March 2019.

Military Units
 The Royal Hampshire Regiment: 13 September 1945.

See also

 List of beaches in Dorset
 Coastline of the United Kingdom

Notes

References

Bibliography

External links

 Official Bournemouth Borough Council information site
 Tourist Information Site
 

 
Local government in Bournemouth
Local government in Dorset
Populated coastal places in Dorset
Unitary authority districts of England
Seaside resorts in England
Towns in Dorset
Beaches of Dorset
Surfing locations in England
Local government districts of South West England
1810 establishments in England
Unparished areas in Dorset
Former non-metropolitan districts
Bournemouth, Christchurch and Poole
Former boroughs in England
Populated places established in 1810